Tuqachar Barlas or, Tuqhachar Barlas also known as Tughachar Barlas, full name Tuqachar Kuregan Barlas, (Mongolian: Тукачар Куреган Барлас d. November 1221) was majorly mentioned in The Secret History of Mongols, he was a Borjigin Prince and Mongol Military Commander from Regiment of during the Siege of Nishapur in 1221, he was the son of Suqu Sechen, ''son-in-law'' to Genghis Khan founder of the Mongol Empire, he was the brother of Qarachar the founder of Barlas confederation, and Qubilai who was a companion of Genghis Khan, he was killed with arrow during the Siege of Nishapur, he was the direct paternal ancestry-uncle of Timur the Central Asian conquer who founded the Timurid Empire.

See also 
Mongol Army
The Secret History of Mongols
Borjigid

References 

Mongol Empire people
Generals of the Mongol Empire
Borjigin
13th-century Mongolian people
1221 deaths
Date of birth unknown